A rookery is a colloquial English term given in the 18th and 19th centuries to a city slum occupied by poor people and frequently also by criminals and prostitutes. Such areas were overcrowded, with low-quality housing and little or no sanitation. Local industry such as coal plants and gasholders polluted the rookery air. Poorly constructed dwellings, built with multiple stories and often crammed into any area of open ground, created densely-populated areas of gloomy, narrow streets and alleyways. By many, these parts of the city were sometimes deemed "uninhabitable".

Etymology
The term rookery originated because of the perceived similarities between a city slum and the nesting habits of the rook, a bird in the crow family. Rooks nest in large, noisy colonies consisting of multiple nests, often untidily crammed into a close group of treetops called a rookery.

The word might also be linked to the slang expression to rook (meaning to cheat or steal), a verb well established in the 16th century and associated with the supposedly thieving nature of the rook bird. The term rookery was first used in print by the poet George Galloway in 1792 to describe "a cluster of mean tenements densely populated by people of the lowest class".

Creation of a rookery
An area might become a rookery when criminals would inhabit dead-end streets for their strategic use in isolation. In other cases, industry that produced noise or odours would drive away inhabitants that would not settle for such an environment. These types of industry could be "some foul factory, a gas-works, the debris of a street market, or an open sewer," which often employed those who lived within the rookery. Another factor which created rookeries was the lack of building regulations, or rather the ignorance of such by construction workers. Middle class houses were too large for single working-class families, so they were often sub-divided to accommodate multiple households - a factor that ran these homes into noise and ruin faster than the new houses built without regulations.

Rookery inhabitants
The people in a rookery were often immigrants, criminals, or working class. Notable groups of immigrants who inhabited rookeries were Jewish and Irish. The jobs available to rookery occupants were undesirable jobs such as rag-picking, street sweeping, or waste removal.

London rookeries

Famous rookeries include the St Giles area of central London, which existed from the 17th century and into Victorian times, an area described by Henry Mayhew in about 1860 in A Visit to the Rookery of St Giles and its Neighbourhood. The St Giles' slum, Bermondsey's Jacob's Island, and the Old Nichol Street Rookery in the East End of London were demolished as part of London slum clearance and urban redevelopment projects in the late 19th century.

In 1850, the English novelist Charles Dickens was given a guided tour of several dangerous rookeries by "Inspector Field, the formidable chief detective of Scotland Yard". A party of six—Dickens, Field, an assistant commissioner, and three lower ranks (probably armed)—made their way into the Rat's Castle, backed by a squad of local police within whistling distance. The excursion started in the evening and lasted until dawn. They went through St Giles and even worse slums, in the Old Mint, along the Ratcliffe Highway and Petticoat Lane. The results of this and other investigations came out in novels, short stories, and straight journalism, of which Dickens wrote a great deal.

Oliver Twist (1838) features the rookery at Jacob's Island:

In Sketches by Boz (1839 ed.), Dickens described a rookery:

In The Rookeries of London (1850) Thomas Beames also described one:

Kellow Chesney gives a whole chapter to the rookeries of London. At their zenith, they were a problem that seemed impossible to solve, yet eventually they did decline. Changes in the law, the growing effectiveness of the police, slum clearances, and perhaps the growing prosperity of the economy gradually had their effect.

Other rookeries
The King Street Rookery in Southampton was also notorious during the early 19th century.

The term has also been used in other parts of the English-speaking world, including the United States and Australia.

References

Sources

Slang
Housing in London
Penology
Social history of London